Garrett Hines (born July 3, 1969) is an American bobsledder who has competed from the late 1990s to the early 2000s. Competing in two Winter Olympics, he won the silver medal in the four-man event at Salt Lake City in 2002.

Hines also won a silver medal in the four-man event at the 2003 FIBT World Championships in Lake Placid, New York.

Prior to his bobsleigh career, Hines also was involved in track and field as a decathlete. Additionally he played American football in high school. He attended Eisenhower High in Blue Island, Illinois for one year before moving to Tennessee, and going to Bartlett High School. Hines then went on to play two sports at Southern Illinois University.

He is a lieutenant colonel in the Virginia National Guard. He coached the bobsled team at the 2022 Winter Olympics.

References
Bobsleigh four-man Olympic medalists for 1924, 1932-56, and since 1964
Bobsleigh four-man world championship medalists since 1930
CNN Sports Illustrated profile of 2002 US bobsled team
FIBT profile

1969 births
Living people
21st-century African-American people
20th-century African-American sportspeople
American male bobsledders
American male decathletes
African-American sportsmen
Bobsledders at the 1998 Winter Olympics
Bobsledders at the 2002 Winter Olympics
Bobsleigh at the 2022 Winter Olympics
Olympic silver medalists for the United States in bobsleigh
Bobsledders from Chicago
Medalists at the 2002 Winter Olympics
National Guard (United States) officers
U.S. Army World Class Athlete Program
Virginia National Guard personnel